Robert Burns Lindsay (July 4, 1824 – February 13, 1902) was a Scots-American politician, elected as the 22nd Governor of the U.S. state of Alabama during Reconstruction, and serving one term from 1870 to 1872.

Early life

Robert B. Lindsay was born in Lochmaben, Dumfriesshire, Scotland, on July 4, 1824. He studied at the University of St Andrews before emigrating to the United States in 1844. He served in the Alabama House of Representatives in 1853 and the Alabama Senate in 1857, 1865, and 1870.

1870 political campaign

A Democrat, Lindsay was elected governor in 1870, following a year of white terrorism against black people: violence, including murders, and intimidation of black and white Republicans and freedmen supporters. For example, five Republicans, four black and one white, were lynched in Calhoun County; three black people (two who were Republican politicians) were murdered in Greene County, in March and October; the white Republican County Solicitor was murdered there in March; and on October 25, a Republican rally of 2,000 black people was disrupted by a mob of whites, who killed four black people and wounded 54 in the Eutaw riot. Black people were intimidated and stayed home from the polls, with Democratic white voters in Greene County and elsewhere taking the state for Lindsay.

He died in Tuscumbia, Alabama on February 13, 1902.

See also
List of U.S. state governors born outside the United States

References

|-

1824 births
1902 deaths
Democratic Party Alabama state senators
Democratic Party members of the Alabama House of Representatives
Democratic Party governors of Alabama
People from Tuscumbia, Alabama
People from Dumfries and Galloway
Alumni of the University of St Andrews
Scottish emigrants to the United States
Scottish Presbyterians
American Presbyterians
19th-century American politicians